Sigayevo is a rural locality (a selo) and the administrative center of Sarapulsky District in the Udmurt Republic, Russia, located  south of the city of Sarapul. Population:

References

Rural localities in Udmurtia